Pseudophasma brachypterum is a species of stick insect found in Brazil, Suriname, Guadeloupe and Peru.

Taxonomy 
The species now known as Pseudophasma brachypterum was first described by Carl Linnaeus in 1763, but under two different names in two different versions of the same work. In Centuria Insectorum Rariorum, it was listed as Gryllus (Mantis) brachypterus, but in the later reprint in Amoenitates Academicæ, the name was changed to Gryllus (Mantis) necydaloides.

References

External links 

Phasmatodea
Insects described in 1763
Insects of South America
Insects of Guadeloupe
Taxa named by Carl Linnaeus